Jean D'Amour (born 9 September 1963) is a Canadian politician, who represented the electoral district of Rivière-du-Loup-Témiscouata in the National Assembly of Quebec. He won the riding in a by-election on 22 June 2009, and previously served as mayor of Rivière-du-Loup from 1999 to 2007.

He was previously president of the Quebec Liberal Party, and was also the party's candidate in Rivière-du-Loup for the 1994 and 2007 provincial elections.

He faced some controversy during the campaign, as he was arrested for impaired driving on 24 September 2008, and pleaded guilty on 19 December. His driver's license was suspended for one year. He has also faced allegations that he violated provincial ethics laws by lobbying the municipal government of Rivière-du-Loup less than two years after leaving office. Premier Jean Charest stood behind D'Amour, however, crediting him with being honest and forthcoming with the voters about his mistakes.

D'Amour defeated the Parti Québécois candidate, former federal Member of Parliament Paul Crête, in the by-election. Crête had been considered the likely winner at the start of the by-election campaign, but was hurt by PQ leader Pauline Marois' public statements that she planned to create a favourable climate for Quebec sovereignty by intentionally seeking to inflame political tensions between Quebec and English Canada.

He resigned the Liberal caucus to sit as an independent on 10 November 2009, following revelations that he was under investigation for allegedly accepting an envelope of money from a developer on behalf of Michel Morin, his successor as mayor of Rivière-du-Loup. An investigation by the province's chief electoral officer cleared him of wrongdoing, and he was subsequently readmitted to the Liberal caucus on 24 December.

Electoral record

External links

References

1963 births
French Quebecers
Living people
Mayors of Rivière-du-Loup
Members of the Executive Council of Quebec
Canadian political party presidents
Quebec Liberal Party MNAs
21st-century Canadian politicians